Cuff is the surname of:

Athletes
 Anthony Cuff (born 1957), New Zealand cyclist
 Ed Cuff Jr. (born 1961), American golfer
 John Cuff (baseball) (1864–1916), American baseball player
 Katherine Cuff, Canadian professor of economics
 Leonard Cuff (1866–1954), New Zealand cricketer and all-round sportsman, and sports administrator
 Omar Cuff (born 1984), American football running back
 Pat Cuff (born 1952), English footballer
 Ward Cuff (1914–2002), American football player
 Wayne Cuff (born 1971), Jamaican cricketer
 Will Cuff (1868–1949), chairman of Everton Football Club, England

Others
 Agnes Cuff (1890–?), mother of actor Alec Guinness
 Dana Cuff, American architect theorist and professor
 John Cuff (optician) (1708–1772), English scientific instrument maker
 John Cuff (politician) (1805–1864), New Zealand politician

See also
 Cuffe, with a list of people surnamed 'Cuffe'